Michael Wayne McKay (born March 5, 1969, in Rockville, Maryland) is a Republican member of the Maryland Senate representing District 1, which covers parts of Garrett. Allegany and Washington counties. He was previously the state-delegate for District 1C.

Early life and career 
McKay was born on March 5, 1969, in Rockville, Maryland. He manages a dry cleaning business, which has four locations in Maryland and West Virginia.

From 2010 to 2014 served as president of the Allegany County Board of County Commissioners and the Cumberland Area Metropolitan Planning Organization. He also served as a member of the Allegany County Board of Education and various other county-level boards.

In June 2013, McKay announced his candidacy for the Maryland House of Delegates, seeking to succeed Delegate LeRoy Myers, who previously announced plans to retire. Following his candidacy announcement, Myers endorsed his bid for the delegate seat. He won the primary election with 56.2 percent of the vote, defeating Republican challenger Ray Givens. McKay's general election opponent, Nick Scarpelli, was financially backed by former state delegate Bruce Poole. He defeated Scarpelli in the general election, receiving 57 percent of the vote.

In the legislature 
McKay was sworn into the Maryland House of Delegates on January 14, 2015.

In July 2017, McKay announced that he would not seek re-election in the 2018 elections, instead choosing to seek election as Allegany County Register of Wills. However, McKay was not selected to fill the position after Rebecca Drew, then-Register of Wills, resigned facing misuse of funds allegations, and later filed to run for re-election to the House of Delegates in October 2017.

In July 2021, McKay announced his candidacy for the Maryland Senate in 2022, seeking to succeed Senator George C. Edwards, who previously announced plans to retire.

Committee assignments 
 Member, Appropriations Committee, 2015–present (public safety & administration subcommittee, 2015–present; oversight committee on pensions, 2015–2017; oversight committee on personnel, 2018–present; capital budget subcommittee, 2019–2020)

Other memberships 
 Joint Committee on Ending Homelessness, 2015–present
 Co-Chair, Study Group on Economic Stability, 2019–present
 Vice-Chair, Washington County Delegation, 2019–present
 Member, Maryland Legislative Sportsmen's Caucus, 2015–present
 Maryland Legislative Transit Caucus, 2019–present

West Virginia annexation letter 
In October 2021, he was one of five Maryland state legislators from Garrett, Allegany and Washington counties who sent a pair of letters to West Virginia officials asking about annexation of Western Maryland to West Virginia. These letters caused a local uproar, with Allegany County officials calling the request a political stunt, an embarrassment and unneeded distraction. Following criticism from local officials and some constituents, Delegate Jason Buckel and State Senator George Edwards issued a letter withdrawing support for the secession proposal.

Political positions

Education 
McKay supports limiting BOOST funding to schools that don't discriminate in admissions, but opposes the elimination of BOOST, saying that it would be "discrimination in itself" and that lawmakers need to have more tolerance for funding religious schools.

McKay introduced legislation during the 2016 legislative session that would bring an agricultural science curriculum to Maryland's public school systems.

Environment 
McKay opposed legislation introduced in the 2015 legislative session that would impose a three-year moratorium on fracking.

Healthcare 
McKay introduced legislation during the 2017 legislative session that would expand Medicaid to establish an adult dental option. During the 2018 legislative session, he introduced a bill that would establish a pilot program for adult Medicaid dental coverage. The bill passed and became law. During the 2019 legislative session, McKay introduced legislation that would establish the Adult Dental Pilot Program to provide basic dental insurance to certain individuals between the ages of 21 and 64 that are eligible for both Medicare and Medicaid. The bill passed and became law.

Minimum wage 
McKay supports the requirement of prevailing wages in public construction contracts. He opposed legislation introduced in the 2019 legislative session that would raise the minimum wage to $15 an hour by 2025, saying that he was concerned about higher wages resulting in families making too much money to qualify for benefits like food stamps and subsidized housing.

Redistricting 
In September 2021, McKay attended a meeting for the Legislative Redistricting Advisory Commission to encourage the commission to keep Frederick County whole in its redistricting map. He also encouraged the commission to decrease the size of the state's 1st legislative district.

Social issues 
McKay introduced legislation in the 2017 legislative session that would allow people to kill or wound black bears if one of the animals threatened a bee colony. The bill passed the House of Delegates by a vote of 124-17.

McKay introduced legislation in the 2019 legislative session that would place term limits on members of Congress.

Taxes
McKay introduced legislation in the 2015 legislative session that would lower the corporate tax rate in Washington and Allegany counties from 8.25 percent to 4 percent.

Electoral history

References

External links
 

Republican Party members of the Maryland House of Delegates
Living people
People from Rockville, Maryland
1969 births
21st-century American politicians
Politicians from Cumberland, Maryland
Businesspeople from Cumberland, Maryland
Republican Party Maryland state senators